CJGB-FM (99.3 MHz, Lite 99.3) is a Canadian radio station in Meaford, Ontario. Owned by Evanov Communications, it broadcasts a soft adult contemporary format.

History 
On January 22, 2014, Dufferin Communications Inc. (Dufferin) received approval from the CRTC to operate a new English-language commercial FM radio station in Meaford, Ontario. The station was given the working title Apple FM, but this was changed to Evanov's networked Jewel brand by May. The station began on air testing at 99.3 FM in August and officially launched on September 1, 2014 as Jewel 99.3.

As with other "Jewel" stations, the station primarily carries soft adult contemporary music, including the syndicated John Tesh show, and the networked evening program The Lounge, which carries adult standards and smooth jazz.

On September 3, 2020, Evanov received CRTC approval to increase the average and maximum effective radiated power for CJGB-FM from 100 to 850 watts in order to improve the station's signal in Meaford.

On July 16, 2021, the station dropped its "Jewel" branding and changed it to Lite 99.3 with its slogan "South Georgian Bay's Lite Favourites".

Former logos

References

External links

Meaford
Meaford
Radio stations in Grey County
Radio stations established in 2014
2014 establishments in Ontario